201 (Northern) Field Hospital is a unit of the Royal Army Medical Corps within the Army Reserve of the British Army.

History
The hospital was formed upon the formation of the TAVR in 1967, from the amalgamation of 1st (Northern) General Hospital, and 149 (Northumbrian) Field Ambulance, as the 201 (Northern) General Hospital. Throughout the Cold War, the hospital was under North East District; and upon transfer to war, would come under control of Commander Medical 1 (BR) Corps, to provide 800 beds in the 4th Garrison Area. During the reforms implemented after the Cold War, the hospital was re-designated as 201 (Northern) Field Hospital. As a consequence of Army 2020, the unit now falls under 2nd Medical Brigade, and is paired with 34 Field Hospital.

Under the Future Soldier programme, the regiment will amalgamate with 212th (Yorkshire) Field Hospital to form 214th (North East) Multi-Role Medical Regiment.  The new regiment will fall under control of the 2nd Medical Group.

Current Structure
The hospital's current structure is as follows:
Headquarters, at Fenham Barracks, Newcastle upon Tyne
A Detachment, at Barnard Armoury, Newton Aycliffe
B Detachment, at Fenham Barracks, Newcastle upon Tyne
C Detachment, at Stockton-on-Tees

References

Units of the Royal Army Medical Corps
Military units and formations established in 1967